Richard Marinus Anthonius Groenendaal (born 13 July 1971) is a Dutch former professional cyclo-cross cyclist. Groenendaal won the UCI Cyclo-cross World Championships in 2000 and the overall titles in the UCI Cyclo-cross World Cup 1997–1998, 2000–2001 and 2003–2004 and in the Cyclo-cross Superprestige in 1997–1998 and 2000–2001.

Early career
Groenendaal's father Reinier was an Elite cyclo-cross cyclist and was Dutch Elite champion in 1985. Groenendaal began to ride as a junior in 1987. He was Dutch Junior champion in 1987–1988 and 1988–89 where he also won the Junior World Cyclo-Cross championships. The following season he joined the Amateur category which he stayed until the 1993–94 season when he turned professional. Early in his career he showed promise as a road rider by finishing in the top ten in the 1992 Tour de l'Avenir, the year he also took part in the Summer Olympics road race. At the start of Groenendaal's career he was often compared to his father Rein and one commentator in Belgium sometimes referred to him as Reintje. However, after two seasons, Groenendaal had stood on more international podiums than his father and the comparisons stopped.

In 1996 Groenendaal joined the newly formed Dutch cycling team Rabobank which he would stay with until the end of the 2006–07 season when he choose to ride for an individual sponsor. Groenendaal's greatest achievements include winning the Cyclo-Cross World Cup in 1998, 2001 and 2004 and becoming Cyclo-Cross World Champion in 2000. Groenendaal attacked during the first lap and was chased by defending cyclo-cross world champion Mario De Clercq who was followed by Groenendaal's Rabobank teammate Sven Nys. Nys would not cooperate in the chase of his commercial teammate and as a result De Clercq never caught Groenendaal enabling Groenendaal to become World Champion. In the following season, Groenendaal dominated cyclo-cross with wins in the Superprestige series and the World Cup as well as being number one UCI ranked rider. Groenendaal also won the Dutch National Cyclo-cross championships. Groenendaal started as a big favourite for the World Championships but suffered a crash during the race and did not recover and as a result lost his Rainbow jersey. In the 2001–02 season, Groenendaal lost the national cyclo-cross jersey to teammate Gerben de Knegt but did win the final World Cup of the season in Heerlen which made him a favourite for the World Championships which were taking place a week later. However, Mario De Clercq won ahead of Nys and Vannoppen. Groenendaal finished fourth and as best non-Belgian. Groenendaal won the first race of the Gazet van Antwerpen trophy of the 2002–03 season with the Koppenbergcross ahead of Nys and Wellens. He also won a World Cup.

For the 2003–04 season, Groenendaal suffered from a knee injury at the start of the season. At the end of the season, he recovered some form and won the Dutch national champions jersey. In an unexpected finale, Groenendaal took the 2003–04 World Cup classification after the final event of the season. Groenendaal won the final world cup race where there were double points on offer in Pijnacker, while teammate and World Cup leader Sven Nys finished further back and lost the lead in the World Cup classification. Groenendaal kept up his form to win the final Gazet van Antwerpen race.

In the 2008 UCI Cyclo-cross World Championships Groenendaal helped Dutch National teammate Lars Boom to launch his attack at the start of the final lap and win the gold medal. Groenendaal finished in twelfth place.

Major victories 

1993–1994
 National Cyclo-Cross championships
1st, Telleriarte Cross
2nd place World championship cyclo-cross
1994–1995
2nd place World championship cyclo-cross
1st, Telleriarte Cross, Soestduinen & Wetzikon Cross
1995–1996
 National Cyclo-Cross Championships
1st, Cyklokros Tábor, Zeddam & Harnes
1996–1997
1st, Steinmaur, Eschenbach, Zurich-Waid, Prada di Pordenone, Vossem
 Superprestige Gavere, Grand Prix Nommay & Soestduinen
1997–1998
World Cup overall title
Superprestige overall title
 National Championships
1st, Steinmaur, Eschenbach, Zurich-Waid, Vlaamse Druivenveldrit Overijse,
 Superprestige Gieten, Hagendorf, Dijon, Brouilly-Odenas, Heerlen,
 Haarnes, Superprestige Gavere, Super Prestige Sint-Michielsgestel,
 Cyclo-cross Kalmthout, Essen & Duinencross Koksijde
1998–1999
1st, Harderwijk, Prague, Eschenbach & Zurich-Waid
1999–2000
 World Cyclo-cross Championships
 national champion cyclo-cross
2nd place World Cup
2nd place Superprestige
1st, Vlaamse Druivenveldrit Overijse
2000–2001
World Cup overall title
Superprestige overall title
 national champion cyclo-cross
2001–2002
World Cup overall title
2nd place Superprestige
2002–2003
 national champion cyclo-cross
Koppenbergcross
2003–2004
World Cup overall title
 national champion cyclo-cross
2004–2005
2nd place Superprestige
 national champion cyclo-cross
2005–2006
1st, Surhuisterveen Cross, Nacht van Woerden & Gieten Cross
2006–2007
1st, Surhuisterveen Cross
2007–2008
1st, Hamburg Cross

See also
 List of Dutch Olympic cyclists

References

External links 
 Official Website
 Website of Sluitingsprijs Oostmalle
 Complete palmares 

1971 births
Living people
Dutch male cyclists
Dutch mountain bikers
Cyclo-cross cyclists
Cross-country mountain bikers
Cyclists at the 1992 Summer Olympics
Olympic cyclists of the Netherlands
Sportspeople from 's-Hertogenbosch
UCI Cyclo-cross World Champions (men)
Cyclists from North Brabant
20th-century Dutch people